To the Death is the debut studio album by American hip hop duo M.O.P. from Brownsville, New York. It was released on April 5, 1994 via Select Street Records, and is produced entirely by DR Period, except for track "Guns N' Roses" produced by Silver D.

Track listing

Personnel
Eric Murray – main performer
Jamal Gerard Grinnage – main performer
Darryl Pittman – producer (tracks: 1-14)
David 'Silver D' Brown – producer (track 15), executive producer, A&R director
Lawrence Elliott – executive producer
Kevin Reynolds – recording engineer (tracks: 2, 15), mix engineer (tracks: 3, 4, 5, 7, 9, 11, 12)
Joanne Carrero – recording engineer (tracks: 3, 4, 7, 9, 11)
Chris Gehringer – mastering
Ian Thornell – artwork
Peter Bodtke – photography

Charts

References

External links

1994 debut albums
M.O.P. albums
Select Records albums